Taiwan Supermodel No. 1 (決戰第一名 Supermodel No. 1) also known as Taiwan's Next Top Model is based on CW's hit reality TV show America's Next Top Model, which was created by model Tyra Banks. Taiwan Super Model No. 1 is the second Top Model franchise that features both genders. The first was Malaysia's I Wanna Be A Model. The show pits contestants against each other in a variety of competitions to determine who will win a modelling contract with Catwalk Production House and other prizes in hopes of a promising career start in the modeling industry.

The first season premiered in January 2008.

Format
Each season of Taiwan Supermodel No. 1 starts with 10 pairs of contestants, male and female.  In each episode, two contestants (male and female) are eliminated, although there have been cases in which no contestants were eliminated by consensus of the judging panel.

In each episode, the models are given three tasks.  The first task is the catwalk, the second task is a challenge, and the third task is a photo shoot.

Series summary

Contestants

Season 1

Season 2

References

External links
 TVBS Taiwan Super Model No. 1 (Season 1)
 TVBS Taiwan Super Model No. 1 (Season 2)

Top Model